Cryptophlebia amblyopa is a species of moth of the family Tortricidae. It is found in Micronesia (Palau Island) and New Caledonia. The habitat consists of rainforests.

References

Moths described in 1976
Grapholitini